Ambulyx carycina is a species of moth in the family Sphingidae. It was described by Karl Jordan in 1919, and is known from Papua New Guinea.

References

Ambulyx
Moths described in 1919
Moths of New Guinea